Jacob Mixsell House, also known as the Northampton County Historical and Genealogical Society, is a historic home located at Easton, Northampton County, Pennsylvania, United States.  It was built in 1833, and is a -story brick building in the Late Federal style.  A rear addition was built about 1850.  The interior features five fireplaces with marble mantles believed to be from King of Prussia, Pennsylvania.  It has housed the Northampton County Historical and Genealogical Society since 1927.

It was added to the National Register of Historic Places in 1980.

References

External links
Northampton County Historical and Genealogical Society website

Historic house museums in Pennsylvania
Houses on the National Register of Historic Places in Pennsylvania
Federal architecture in Pennsylvania
Houses completed in 1833
Houses in Northampton County, Pennsylvania
Museums in Northampton County, Pennsylvania
National Register of Historic Places in Northampton County, Pennsylvania
Individually listed contributing properties to historic districts on the National Register in Pennsylvania
Historic House Museums of the Pennsylvania Germans